(Archaic English name: Alexander Márai; 11 April 1900 – 21 February 1989) was a Hungarian writer, poet, and journalist.

Biography
Márai was born on 11 April 1900 in the city of Kassa, Hungary (now Košice, Slovakia). Through his father, he was a relative of the Hungarian noble Országh family. In 1919, he was an enthusiastic supporter of the Hungarian Soviet Republic and worked as a journalist. He joined the Communists, becoming the founder of the "Activist and Anti-National Group of Communist Writers". After the fall of the Hungarian Soviet Republic, his family found it safer to leave the country, thus he continued his studies in Leipzig. Márai traveled to and lived in Frankfurt, Berlin, and Paris and briefly considered writing in German, but eventually chose his mother language, Hungarian, for his writings. In Egy polgár vallomásai (English: "Confessions of a citizen"), Márai identifies the mother tongue language with the concept of the nation itself. He settled in Krisztinaváros, Budapest, in 1928. In the 1930s, he gained prominence with a precise and clear realist style. He was the first person to write reviews of the work of Franz Kafka.

He wrote very enthusiastically about the First and Second Vienna Awards, in which as the result of the German-Italian arbitration Czechoslovakia and Romania had to give back part of the territories that Hungary lost in the Treaty of Trianon, including his native Kassa (Košice). Nevertheless, Márai was highly critical of the Nazis.

Márai authored 46 books. His 1942 book Embers (Hungarian title: A gyertyák csonkig égnek, meaning "The Candles Burn Down to the Stump") expresses a nostalgia for the bygone multi-ethnic, multicultural society of the Austro-Hungarian Empire, reminiscent of the works of Joseph Roth. In 2006 an adaptation of this novel for the stage, written by Christopher Hampton, was performed in London.

He also disliked the communist regime that seized power after World War II, and left – or was driven away – in 1948. After living for some time in Italy, Márai settled in the city of San Diego, in the United States. Márai joined Radio Free Europe between 1951 and 1968. Márai was extremely disappointed in the Western powers for not helping the Hungarian Revolution of 1956.

He continued to write in his native language, but was not published in English until the mid-1990s. Like other memoirs by Hungarian writers and statesmen, it was first published in the West, because it could not be published in the Hungary of the post-1956 Kádár era. The English version of the memoir was published posthumously in 1996. After his wife died in 1986, Márai retreated more and more into isolation. In 1987, he lived with advanced cancer and his depression worsened when he lost his adopted son, John. He ended his life with a gunshot to his head in San Diego in 1989. He left behind three granddaughters; Lisa, Sarah and Jennifer Márai.

Largely forgotten outside of Hungary, his work (consisting of poems, novels, and diaries) has only been recently "rediscovered" and republished in French (starting in 1992), Polish, Catalan, Italian, English, German, Spanish, Portuguese, Bulgarian, Czech, Slovak, Danish, Icelandic, Korean, Lithuanian, Dutch, Urdu and other languages too, and is now considered to be part of the 20th-century European literary canon.

Evaluation
“Hungarian Sándor Márai was the insightful chronicler of a collapsing world." – Le Monde

"It is perhaps one of the [works that] thus impacted me a lot." - Dilma Rousseff in the book Embers.

Bibliography

Translated into English
 The Rebels (1930, published in English in 2007, translation by George Szirtes), Hungarian title: A zendülők. 
 Esther's Inheritance (1939, published in English in 2008), Hungarian title: Eszter hagyatéka. 
 Casanova in Bolzano (1940, published in English in 2004), Hungarian title: Vendégjáték Bolzanóban 
 Portraits of a Marriage (1941 & 1980, published in English in 2011), Hungarian titles: Az igazi (1941) and Judit... és az utóhang (1980) 
 Embers (1942, published in English in 2001), Hungarian title: A gyertyák csonkig égnek. 
 Memoir of Hungary (1971, published in English in 2001), Hungarian title: Föld, föld...! 
 The Withering World: Selected Poems by Sandor Marai (Translations by John M. Ridland and Peter V. Czipott of 163 poems, published in English in 2013)

Gallery

Notes

External links

 Official Marai site at Knopf, which is releasing Marai's novels in English:
 Sándor Márai Blog – a fan blog with news, reviews, links
 Márai at Hunlit
 70 Years Later, A New Chance To Read 'Marriage' NPR story about new translation of "Portraits of A Marriage" (with link to excerpt)
 Sándor Márai and Naples A documentary about Márai's Italian years

Hungarian anti-communists
Hungarian journalists
Hungarian male poets
Hungarian exiles
Hungarian emigrants to the United States
Writers from Košice
Leipzig University alumni
Suicides by firearm in California
Hungarian-German people
1900 births
1989 suicides
20th-century Hungarian novelists
20th-century Hungarian poets
20th-century Hungarian male writers
Hungarian male novelists
20th-century journalists
1989 deaths